The Hindu Sanskriti Ankh in India, are an ancient series of books originally from North India. These books were widely circulated in the early part of 19th century. The series of books highlighted the Bharatiya Sanskriti, that is, the culture of India. Sanskriti is a word of Sanskrit and means "culture", whereas Bharatiya means Indian, predominantly Sanatana, that is, Hindu.

General references
Indian philosophical terms : glossary and sources by Kala Acharya, et al.  Mumbai : Somaiya Publications, ©2004. 
Bhakti, pathway to God : the way of love, union with God, and universal brotherhood in Hinduism and Christianity by Kala Acharya; Mumbai:  Somaiya Publication, 2003.

References

Hindi-language literature
19th century in India
Hinduism studies books